The Autonomous Trade Union Confederation (ASzSz) in a national trade union center in Hungary. It has a membership of 120,000.

The ASzSz is affiliated with the International Trade Union Confederation, and the European Trade Union Confederation.

References

External links
Official site

European Trade Union Confederation
International Trade Union Confederation
National trade union centers of Hungary